Charcoal is used in food to colour it black and for its supposed health benefits.

Activated charcoal, typically made from bamboo or coconut shell, is used as a food ingredient. It gives food an earthy, smoky taste and the black colouring gives the food an exotic, fashionable appearance.

Some health benefits have been claimed for charcoal back to classical times, when Hippocrates and Pliny recommended it for conditions such as anthrax and vertigo. Activated charcoal adsorbs chemicals and so may bind to both toxins and vital nutrients such as vitamins; therefore, it may also make prescription medications less effective. Its effects are therefore broad and indiscriminate.

Chefs and food retailers that have pioneered the use of charcoal in food include Ferran Adrià, Burger King, René Redzepi, Simon Rogan and Waitrose.

Activated charcoal is the primary ingredient in black ice cream, which is often served with a black cone also containing charcoal. The ice cream usually contains other flavorings such as horchata, almond, and coconut in order to mask the taste of the charcoal.

See also
Charring

References

Charcoal